Andrey Vyacheslavovich Budykin (born 14 April 1971) is a retired Russian hammer thrower who won a bronze medal at the 1990 World Junior Championships. His career as a senior peaked in 1995, when he set his personal best at 79.70 m and was ranked ninth in the world. Later he lost his eyesight in an accident, but continued competing in the discus throw, becoming the national champion among handicapped athletes in 2011 and 2012, and finishing second in 2013. He was part of the 2014 Winter Paralympics torch relay.

References

External links
Андрей Будыкин, мастер спорта международного класса (толкание ядра, метание диска), чемпион России (спорт слепых) (Photo)

1971 births
Living people
Russian male hammer throwers
Russian male discus throwers
Soviet male hammer throwers